Bapara agasta is a species of snout moth in the genus Bapara. It was described by Turner in 1911, and is known from northern Australia.

References

Tirathabini
Moths described in 1911